Our Story (original title: Notre histoire, also known as Separate Rooms) is a 1984 French absurdist comedy drama film written and directed by Bertrand Blier and starring Alain Delon and Nathalie Baye.

Plot
Alone in a first-class compartment of a train from Geneva to Paris, a man is reading a motor magazine and drinking beer. A woman enters, challenges him to make love, and afterwards gets out at the next stop. Following her, he takes her to a hotel for a further bout and afterwards hires a car to drive her to her empty home.

He is Robert Avranches, a well-off garage owner with a wife and two little children, and she is Donatienne Pouget, a 33-year-old divorcee whose two children have been removed because of her lifestyle. When he says he'd like to stay with her, she says she is going dancing and returns late at night with a carload of friends from the night club.

There follows a purgatory for Robert, obsessed with a woman who has slept with all the neighbours and now picks up men on trains for fun. Men try to dissuade him and women try to console him, while all he wants is Donatienne, who eventually avoids his attentions by disappearing. He sets off in search of her but is retrieved by his brother and friends from Paris, who take him back to his home. His wife, delighted to have him back, looks identical to Donatienne.

Cast
 Alain Delon as Robert Avranches
 Nathalie Baye as Donatienne Pouget / Marie-Thérèse Chatelard / Geneviève Avranches
 Michel Galabru as Emile (one of Donatienne's neighbours)
 Gérard Darmon as Duval
 Geneviève Fontanel as Madeleine, wife of Emile
 Jean-Pierre Darroussin as the traveller
 Jean-François Stévenin as Chatelard, husband of Marie-Thérèse
 Sabine Haudepin as Carmen
 Ginette Garcin as the florist
 Vincent Lindon as Brechet
 Bernard Farcy as Farid
 Norbert Letheule as Paraiso
 Jean-Louis Foulquier as Bob
 Philippe Laudenbach as Sam
 Paul Guers as Clark
 Notable appearances also include Jean Reno and Jean-Claude Dreyfus

Awards and nominations

1985 César Awards (France)''' 

Won: Best Actor : Alain Delon
Won: Best Writing : Bertrand Blier
Nominated: Best Production Design : Bernard Evein
Nominated: Best Editing : Claudine Merlin

References

External links
 
 

1984 films
1980s French-language films
French musical drama films
Films directed by Bertrand Blier
1980s musical drama films
Rail transport films
1984 drama films
1980s French films